Screw pine craft of Kerala is the craft of making different types of mats and wall hangings using the leaves of the screw pine plant as practised by artisans in Kerala. As per an application filed by Development Commissioner (Handicrafts), Ministry of Textiles, Government of India, "Screw pine craft of Kerala"  has been granted Registration in Part A in respect of Mats, Door Mats, Wall Hangings, Bed Mats, Prayer Mats falling in Class – 27 under Sub-section (1) of Section 13 of Geographical Indications of Goods (Registration and Protection) Act, 1999 with effect from 30 November 2015.

Weaving of mats using leaves of the screw pine plants is a craft practiced mostly by women in Kerala. This craft, which is practised by artisans in all the districts of Kerala, has been in existence as long ago as 800 years. The mats produced by screw pine has a significant role in the traditional customs of Kerala. Important visitors to homes were offered these mats as honoured articles to be sat upon. Finer varieties of these mats were also used as bed for sleeping.

References

Geographical indications in Kerala
Indian handicrafts